David John Climenhaga  (born February 1, 1952) is a Canadian union activist, blogger, journalist, author and teacher.
 
Born in Victoria, British Columbia, he has lived in Victoria, Prince Rupert, Ottawa, Toronto, Calgary, Edmonton and St. Albert. He spent many years as a full-time journalist with the Toronto Globe and Mail, where he worked as a business reporter and copy editor, and the Calgary Herald, where he worked as a business reporter, political reporter, copy editor and night city editor.

In 1995, his book A Poke in the Public Eye, a light-hearted look at the often-uncomfortable relationships among politicians, journalists and public relations people was published by Detselig Books of Calgary. In 1997 he was awarded the degree of Master of Journalism by Carleton University in Ottawa for a thesis dealing with the decision of the Alberta Government of Premier Ralph Klein to wind up the province's highly regarded system of regional planning. The thesis was based in part on journalistic work he had done on the Calgary Herald's City Hall and Regional Affairs beats.

In 1999 and 2000, Climenhaga was a leader in the attempt by the Communications Energy and Paperworkers Union of Canada to organize a union local and negotiate a first contract with the Calgary Herald. Before and during the eight-month strike by journalists in 1999 and 2000, Climenhaga was Vice-President of Local 115A of the CEP. When the strike ended in June 2000 with the dissolution of the union, he left journalism to work as Communications Director of the Alberta Union of Provincial Employees, which with about 90,000 members in 2016 is Alberta's largest union. In 2011, he went to work for the United Nurses of Alberta, which represents more than 30,000 Registered Nurses in Alberta.

Climenhaga has also taught courses in introductory journalism, newspaper copy-editing and political science at the Southern Alberta Institute of Technology in Calgary and in journalism at The King's University College, a private Christian university in Edmonton.

In October 2007 and 2013, Climenhaga ran for city council in the Edmonton-area city of St. Albert. Until the paper folded in July 2011, he wrote a regular column on Alberta politics for the Saint City News, a community weekly in St. Albert. He also writes AlbertaPolitics.ca, a political blog with a large readership, and contributes regularly to the website rabble.ca which describes Climenhaga and his fellow contributors as "some of the best progressive writers in Canada."

Climenhaga is a recreational karate enthusiast, holding Yondan rank (fourth-degree black belt) in Uechi-Ryu karate.

He is the son of Dr. John Leroy Climenhaga, the Canadian astrophysicist.

References

External links
 AlbertaPolitics.ca

1952 births
Canadian male journalists
Canadian male non-fiction writers
Carleton University alumni
Journalists from British Columbia
Living people
Writers from Victoria, British Columbia
Trade unionists from Alberta